Mozambique – South Africa relations refers to the bilateral relationship of Mozambique and South Africa. Governmental relations began in 1923, during the colonial era, when the Union of South Africa entered into formal agreements with the Portuguese Empire for the colony of Portuguese East Africa (Mozambique) in regard to labour, transport and commercial matters. Graça Machel, the inaugural First Lady of Mozambique from 1975 to 1986, later married the first post-Apartheid-era President of South Africa, Nelson Mandela, on July 18, 1998, Mandela's 80th birthday. They remained married until Mandela's death on December 5, 2013, at the age of 95. She was previously married to Mozambique's first president, Samora Machel, who died in a plane crash on October 19, 1986, aged 53. Although South Africa is preponderant in the region in terms of economic resources and military might, Mozambique is considered a second-tier state in Southern Africa and a crucial partner for Pretoria.

Apartheid

White relations
White South Africans and Whites in Portuguese-controlled Mozambique enjoyed very close relations during the colonial era. When South Africa implemented the apartheid laws, Lourenço Marques, the capital of Mozambique, became a destination for many Whites to go to escape the conservative social policies of the apartheid government. When Mozambique gained independence from Portugal in 1975, thousands of Mozambique-born Whites moved across the border to South Africa, the descendants of which are today Portuguese South Africans.

Black relations
The Shangaan or Tsonga people live on both sides of the Mozambique–South Africa border. Black movement between the two states existed to a large extent due to the possibility of employment of Mozambicans in the mines of South Africa. The cross-border remissions form an important part of the Mozambican economy.

War
South Africa played an important role in the Mozambican Civil War in supporting RENAMO against the FRELIMO government. South Africa and Mozambique signed the Nkomati Accord in 1984, which officially ended South Africa's role in the war, though it continued until the advent of Democracy in South Africa in 1994.

Post-Apartheid

Conflict
South African National Defence Force have worked with the Mozambique Defence Armed Forces to combat the insurgency in Cabo Delgado. The SAS Drakensberg has also engaged in counter-piracy patrols off the coast of Mozambique.

References

 
South Africa
Bilateral relations of South Africa